Lepna is a small borough in Rakvere Parish, Lääne-Viru County, in northeastern Estonia. As of 2011 Census, the settlement's population was 415.

References

Boroughs and small boroughs in Estonia